Jaak-Hans Kuks (12 September 1942 in Tallinn – 23 February 2019) was an Estonian politician. He was a member of IX Riigikogu.

References

1942 births
2019 deaths
Members of the Riigikogu, 1999–2003
Politicians from Tallinn